China–Syria relations are foreign relations between China and Syria. The nationalist government of China recognized Syria in 1946. Diplomatic relations between both countries were established on August 1, 1956. China has an embassy in Damascus and Syria has an embassy in Beijing, the two governments generally maintaining a friendly political and economic relationship for the last several decades, which continues to endure despite the Syrian civil war.

Diplomatic ties

Syria did not recognized the People's Republic of China when it was founded in 1949. Following the Bandung Conference in 1955 their diplomatic relations improved which led to the sign of trade agreements. Next year Syria recognized China.

In addition to more typical diplomatic ties, in the early stages of the Syrian civil war, China's Special Envoy on the Middle East Issue Wu Sike dealt with Syrian issues. His successor Gong Xiaosheng continued to make Syrian diplomatic issues a priority until 2016, when China appointed a separate Special Envoy for the Syrian Crisis, Xie Xiaoyan.

Syria participates in the China-Arab States Cooperation Forum (CASCF), which is the primary multilateral cooperation body between China and the Arab states. Although the Arab states primarily coordinate in CASCF through the Arab League, Syria (like Libya) has coordinated individually since the suspension of its Arab League membership in 2011.

Economic relations
China and Syria have significant trade relations. In 2009, mutual trade between the two countries was worth nearly $2.2 billion according to figures from the International Monetary Fund, and similar trade volumes were expected by the Syrian Ministry of Economy for 2010. The trade, however, is almost entirely one way. Exports from Syria to China made up less than 1 percent of the total trade volume at $5.6 million, while exports from China to Syria were worth $2.2 billion making China Syria's main importer. China is actively involved in Syria's oil industry. China National Petroleum Corporation is a joint venture partner with Syria's national oil company and Royal Dutch Shell in the Al-Furat Petroleum Company, the main oil producing consortium in the country. The Al-Furat consortium produces some 100,000 barrels per day (bpd). Sinochem is another Chinese oil company that has been very active in recent oil exploration tenders. China's CNPC and Sinopec are helping to revive output under rehabilitation contracts for small mature oil fields in Syria.

In 1991 China sold a miniature neutron source reactor called SRR-1 to Syria. In 2015 Syria stated its willingness to send back the uranium to China in the aftermath of its disarmament of its chemical weapons.

Human rights
In June 2020, Syria was one of 53 countries that backed the Hong Kong national security law at the United Nations.

Military relations
Chinese Muslims fought against Japan in World War II. In order to gain backing for China in Muslim countries, Egypt, Syria, and Turkey was visited by Hui Muslim Ma Fuliang (馬賦良) and Uyghur Muslim Isa Yusuf Alptekin in 1939. The Hindu leaders Tagore and Gandhi and Muslim Jinnah both discussed the war with the Chinese Muslim delegation under Ma Fuliang while in Turkey İsmet İnönü met with the Chinese Muslim delegation. Newspapers in China reported the visit. Ma Fuliang and Isa were working for Zhu Jiahua.

The bombardment of Chinese Muslims by the warplanes of the Japanese was reported in the newspapers of Syria. Afghanistan, Iran, Iraq, Syria, and Lebanon were all toured by the delegation. The Foreign Minister, Prime Minister, and President of Turkey met with the Chinese Muslim delegation after they came via Egypt in May 1939. Gandhi and Jinnah met with the Hui Ma Fuliang and Uyghur Isa Alptekin as they denounced Japan.

Ma Fuliang, Isa Alptekin, Wang Zengshan, Xue Wenbo, and Lin Zhongming all went to Egypt to denounce Japan in front of the Arab and Islamic words.

In 1969, then chief of staff Mustafa Tlass led a military mission to Beijing, and secured weapons deals with the Chinese government. In a move calculated to deliberately antagonize the Soviets to stay out of the succession dispute then going on in Syria, Mustafa Tlass allowed himself to be photographed waving Mao Zedong's Little Red Book, just two months after bloody clashes between Chinese and Soviet armies on the Ussuri river. The Soviet Union then agreed to back down and sell Syria weapons.

In 1989, Libya has agreed to finance Syria's purchase of M-9 missiles from China. Missile sales to Syria were cancelled under U.S. pressure in 1991.

In 1993 and 1996, China was reported to be assisting Syrian ballistic missile programs.

On October 19, 1999, Defence Minister of China, General Chi Haotian, met with Syrian Defence Minister Mustafa Tlass in Damascus, Syria, to discuss expanding military ties between Syria and China.

In August 2016 Guan Youfei, Director of the Office for International Military Cooperation of China's Central Military Commission, stated that: "The Chinese and Syrian militaries traditionally have a friendly relationship, and the Chinese military is willing to keep strengthening exchanges and cooperation with the Syrian military".

Syrian Civil War 
Since his appointment to the newly created position in 2016, China's Special Envoy for the Syria Crisis Xie Xiaoyan has focused on diplomatic efforts including: achieving a cease fire, facilitating a political resolution to the conflict, humanitarian assistance, counterterrorism activities, reconstruction, and condemning chemical weapons use. Xie emphasizes the need for a full investigation of alleged chemical weapons use by the Assad government. Xie also states that the world must learn from the experiences of Iraq and Syria and avoid regime change via foreign intervention. As its Special Envoy emphasizes, China's position is that a political solution must be reached that respects Syria's sovereignty and rights to noninterference and nonintervention, consistent with China's Five Principles of Peaceful Coexistence. China takes an active role in facilitating a political resolution, including meeting with both the Syrian government and opposition groups.

China also views counter-terrorism as a major concern to be addressed in the context of the Syrian crisis. In China's view, some of the Syrian opposition groups (for example, the Turkistan Islamic Party, or TIP) are terrorists. China attributes the uptick in terror in China from 2012 to 2015 as partially due to TIP, particularly via its ties to Uyghurs in China's Xinjiang province. China frames Russia's military intervention in Syria in terms of counter-terrorism operations.

China has also cooperated with Syria on the issue of Uighur militants joining the Syrian opposition in fighting Assad's government, with some sources indicating as many as 5,000 Uighurs from Xinjiang having traveled to Syria in recent years. China has also allegedly increased direct military links to Syria's government, although more discreetly than Russia has done. Although China claims it has no military presence in Syria, there were reports of military cooperation in 2016, 2017, and 2018.

In its position as a permanent member of the UN Security Council, China vetoed ten resolutions regarding Syria between 2010 and 2020, consistent with China's trend towards a more vocal position at the UN regarding matters of sovereignty.

After over a decade of civil war in Syria, the question of who will be in charge of the reconstruction has arisen over and over again (though any practical activity in that direction will have to be suspended during the acute stage of the coronavirus crisis). China's position on this issue can be discerned by looking at its prewar relations with Syria and the way it has behaved during the war.

See also
Ambassador of the People's Republic of China to Syria
Foreign relations of the People's Republic of China
Foreign relations of Syria
Russia–Syria relations
Daqin

Notes

References

Bibliography

External links
Chinese Ministry of Foreign Affairs about the relations with Syria

 
Bilateral relations of Syria
Syria